Parliamentary elections were held in Colombia on 11 March 1990 alongside local elections and an unofficial referendum on electing a Constitutional Assembly.

Background
After the murder of presidential candidate Luis Carlos Galán in August 1989, students started a movement calling for a referendum "for peace and democracy" to be held on 21 January 1990. However, under pressure from drug cartels, the government rejected the proposal. The students then set up the "We can still save Colombia" movement, which called for a referendum alongside the general elections on 11 March 1990 on establishing a Constitutional Assembly.

Whilst the referendum campaign remained unofficial, it was encouraged by the Ministry of Government. Voters cast votes with six ballots for various levels of government. The campaign encouraged them to add a seventh ballot, "la séptima papeleta", with their referendum vote on it.

Campaign
The campaign was marked by violence from left- and right-wing paramilitary groups linked to drug cartels. Several politicians were killed. Two days before the election the 19th of April Movement signed a peace treaty with the government and participated in the elections.

Results

Senate

Chamber of Representatives

Referendum

Aftermath
Following the unofficial referendum, President Virgilio Barco Vargas issued decree 927 on 3 May calling for a referendum on electing a Constitutional Assembly alongside the presidential elections on 27 May. Although this was in violation of article 218 of the constitution, which gave Congress sole rights to reform the constitution, the referendum was approved by the Supreme Court. The Assembly was elected in December 1990, and produced the 1991 constitution.

References

Parliamentary elections in Colombia
Referendums in Colombia
1990 in Colombia
Colombia
Colombia
Election and referendum articles with incomplete results